Matilda Castren (born 18 January 1995) is a Finnish professional golfer playing on the LPGA Tour. In 2021 she won the LPGA Mediheal Championship to become the first player from Finland to win on the LPGA Tour.

Career
Castren won the 2011 Doral Publix Junior Classic in the U.S. and the 2013 Skandia Junior Open in Sweden, and was runner-up at the 2013 Portuguese Ladies Amateur. She represented Finland at the 2011, 2012 and 2013 European Girls' Team Championship, the 2014, 2015 and 2016 European Ladies' Team Championship, and at the 2014 and 2016 Espirito Santo Trophy. She was also on the winning Vagliano Trophy team in  2017.

Castren played college golf at Florida State University beginning in 2014 and graduated in May 2017 with a degree in International Affairs, after winning seven individual titles in collegiate competition during her time with the Florida State Seminoles women's golf team, a school record. She was named second-Team All-American by the Women's Golf Coaches Association and Golfweek in 2014 and was a three-time All-ACC selection (2014, 2016 and 2017) as one of only three players in school history. She set school record for lowest career stroke average (72.52) over her four-year varsity career.

Castren played two seasons on the Symetra Tour in 2018 and 2019, before she finished T26 at the LPGA Final Qualifying Tournament to earn her card for the 2020 LPGA Tour. In only six starts she earned enough to qualify via the money list for her first major, the 2020 Women's PGA Championship, where she was T9 after a first round of 69 and finished the tournament T23.

In her rookie season on the LPGA Tour, she won the 2021 LPGA Mediheal Championship in just her 15th career LPGA Tour start.

In July, Castren claimed her first Ladies European Tour (LET) title after she shot a final round of 68 to win the 2021 Gant Ladies Open in her native Finland. She needed to secure a victory on the LET to become a member of the tour and be eligible for the 2021 European Solheim Cup Team.

Amateur wins
2011 (1) Doral Publix Junior Classic 16-18
2013 (1) Skandia Junior Open Girls
2014 (2) Florida State Match-Up, Web.com/Marsh Landing Intercollegiate
2015 (1) Jacksonville Classic
2016 (3) Florida Challenge, NCAA Shoal Creek Regional Championships, Jim West Challenge
2017 (1) Clemson Invitational

Source:

Professional wins (3)

LPGA Tour wins (1)

Ladies European Tour wins (1)

Symetra Tour wins (1)

Results in LPGA majors

CUT = missed the half-way cut
WD = withdrew
NT = no tournament
T = tied

Team appearances
Amateur
European Girls' Team Championship (representing Finland): 2011, 2012, 2013
European Ladies' Team Championship (representing Finland): 2014, 2015, 2016
Espirito Santo Trophy (representing Finland): 2014, 2016
Vagliano Trophy (representing the Continent of Europe): 2017 (winners)

Source:

Professional
Solheim Cup (representing Europe): 2021 (winners)

Solheim Cup record

References

External links

Finnish female golfers
LPGA Tour golfers
Ladies European Tour golfers
Olympic golfers of Finland
Golfers at the 2020 Summer Olympics
Florida State Seminoles women's golfers
Sportspeople from Espoo
1995 births
Living people